John Murray, 11th Duke of Atholl (19 January 1929 – 15 May 2012), was a South African-born hereditary peer of the Peerage of Scotland, hereditary Clan Chief of Clan Murray, and Colonel-in-Chief of the Atholl Highlanders. As Duke of Atholl, he commanded the only legal private army in Europe. He acceded as the 11th duke on 27 February 1996, succeeding his second cousin, once removed, The 10th Duke of Atholl.

Early life
The Duke was born in Johannesburg, South Africa, as the only child of Major George Murray (Blithfield, Staffordshire, 20 November 1884 - Pretoria, 21 June 1940) and wife (Seaford, East Sussex, 17 January 1928) Joan (Johannesburg, Transvaal Colony, 23 June 1902 - 2000), daughter of William Edward Eastwood (Bradford, West Yorkshire, 7 September 1862 - Mooi River, 14 February 1946) and wife (12 July 1895) Edith Caroline Bidwell (25 March 1870 - 1963), paternal granddaughter of John William Eastwood (Yorkshire, 1831 - ?), manager of the Bradford Old Bank Ltd., and wife ... and maternal granddaughter of Henry William Bidwell (Norwich, Norfolk, 1830 - Uitenhage, Cape Colony, 17 January 1899) and wife (Shoreditch, London, Middlesex, April / June 1859) Mary Elizabeth White. His father was killed on active service in the Second World War.

He was paternal grandson of the Rev. Douglas Stuart Murray (Southfleet, Kent, 28 May 1853 - London, Middlesex, 19 March 1920), Rector of Blithfield, Staffordshire, and wife (Wigan, Manchester, Lancashire, 22 April 1879) Harriet Georgina Isabel Bridgeman (Brighton, East Sussex, 7 December 1853 - London, Middlesex, 11 November 1921). He was son of the Rev. George Edward Murray (Isle of Man, 1 September 1818 - Southfleet, Kent, 14 September 1854) and wife (Bath, Somerset, 18 July 1848) Penelope Frances Elizabeth Austin (Durham, County Durham, 4 October 1829 - Bath, Somerset, 5 October 1910) (daughter of Brigadier-General John Austin and wife (Llanelly, later Llanelli, Carmarthen, Carmarthenshire, Wales, 12 July 1828) Margaret Pemberton, daughter of Richard Pemberton and wife Elizabeth Jackson) and she was daughter of the Rev. Hon. George Thomas Orlando Bridgeman (21 August 1823 - Wigan, Manchester, Lancashire, 25 November 1895), son of the 2nd Earl of Bradford, and wife (25 June 1850) Emily Mary Bagot (? - 13 December 1853), daughter of the Rt. Rev. Hon. Richard Bagot, Bishop of Oxford and Bishop of Bath and Wells. He was, in turn, son of the Rt. Rev. George Murray, Bishop of Rochester, who was the son of Lord George Murray, the second son of The 3rd Duke of Atholl.

He was educated at Michaelhouse (1941 – 1946) in what was then the Natal midlands. His time spent at the school allowed him to gain an appreciation for cricket and the outdoors.
https://foundation.wikimedia.org/wiki/Terms_of_Use
He graduated with a Bachelor of Science degree in engineering from the University of the Witwatersrand, a leading South African university.

Life
After taking his degree, Murray worked as a land surveyor.

On 15 December 1956 in Pretoria, he married Margaret "Peggy" Yvonne Leach (born Louis Trichardt, 8 July 1935), the only daughter of Ronald Leonard Leach of Louis Trichardt, Transvaal, South Africa (Pretoria, 31 August 1910 – Louis Trichardt, 18 December 1964) and wife (Lovedale Park, Louis Trichardt) Faith Kleinenberg (Louis Trichardt, 20 July 1913 – Louis Trichardt, 11 June 1968), paternal granddaughter of Charles Ronald Leach (Whittlesea, Cape Colony, 26 March 1887 – Eshowe, 7 December 1953) and first wife Louise Adelaide Zeederberg (? – Whittlesea, 5 June 1922) and maternal granddaughter of Johannes Petrus Stephanus Kleinenberg (25 June 1874 - 1925) and wife (16 February 1898) Letitia Pittendrigh Cooksley (1875 - 1941); Charles Ronald Leach was son of Charles William Leach (Poplar Grove, Queenstown, Colony of Natal, 7 January 1859 - Idutywa, 12 January 1913) and first wife Agnes Mary Bell ? - Poplar Grove, Queenstown, Colony of Natal, 15 November 1889), paternal grandson of John Leach (Uitenhage, Zulu Kingdom, 28 July 1828 - Poplar Grove, Queenstown, Colony of Natal, 1 August 1906) (son of Benjamin John Leach, who moved in 1820 to South Africa, and wife Ann Oxenham) and wife (Worcester, Cape Colony, 18 August 1849) Sara Ann Hinds (London, Middlesex, 22 July 1832 - Grahamstown, 22 November 1916) (daughter of T. W. Hinds and wife ...) and maternal grandson of William Bell and wife Mary Ann Mason; Louise Adelaide Zeederberg was daughter of Hans Jacobus Zeederberg (Colony of Natal, 22 January 1851 - ?), storekeeper in Pretoria in 1878, and wife (Pretoria, Transvaal Colony, 3 July 1878) Jessie Gray (Colony of Natal, 1855 - 12 December 1899), paternal granddaughter of Petrus Hans Zeederberg (Cape Town, Cape Colony, 25 September 1814 - Erf 35, Pietermaritzburg, Colony of Natal, 12 June 1884) (son of Roelof Abraham Zetterberg, later Zeederberg, from Strömstad, Sweden, and wife Margaretha Elisabeth Louw) and wife Sophia Margrita Ruisch, and maternal granddaughter of John Gray and wife Ann Young; Johannes Petrus Stephanus Kleinenberg was son of Bauke Theunis Kleinenberg (Drenthe, Netherlands, 3 August 1823 - Potchefstroom, Colony of Natal, 15 October 1899), who emigrated in 1852 to South Africa, teacher and lecturer in Piketberg and Calvinia, married firstly in Piketberg, Cape Colony, on 10 April 1854 Maria Susanna Theron (Vlermuisdrift, later Bridgetown, near Athlone, near Cape Town, Cape Colony, June 1813 - Calvinia, Cape Colony, 30 December 1863), and second wife (Calvinia, Cape Colony, 26 April 1864) Maria Magdalena Margaretha Coetzee (26 April 1847 - ?), paternal grandson of Teunis Kleinenberg (Rolde, Drenthe, Dutch Republic, 8 June 1794 - Amen, Rolde, Drenthe, Netherlands, 25 February 1864), farmer (son of Bauke Tonnis Kleinenberg and wife Grietien Hindriks) and wife Gebke Kerkhof and maternal grandson of Dirk Johannes Coetzee (near Cape Town, Cape Colony, 3 March 1805 - Piketberg, Cape Colony, 26 Abril 1857) (son of Johan Hendrik Coetzee and wife Johanna Catharina Reeder) and wife (Cape Town, Cape Colony, 6 September 1829) Johanna Sophia Boonzaaier (near Stellenbosch, Cape Colony, 26 November 1809 - Piketberg, Cape Colony, 18 June 1853) (daughter of Petrus Johannes Boonzaaier and wife Hermina Dempers); Letitia Pittendrigh Cooksley was daughter of John Skinner Cooksley (Barnstable, Devon, 3 February 1837 - 16 February 1898), trader in South Africa, in Port Elizabeth in 1862, and wife Mary Pittindrigh (1844 - Lovedale Park, Louis Trichardt, 1937) and paternal granddaughter of William Cooksley and wife ... Skinner. They had three children: 
 Lady Jennifer Murray (born 8 February 1958), who has married and has children
 Bruce Murray, now 12th Duke of Atholl (born 6 April 1960), who has married and has children
 Lord Craig John Murray (born 1963), who has married and has children

In 1996, on the death of his kinsman, a second cousin, once removed, Iain Murray, 10th Duke of Atholl, Murray succeeded as 11th Duke at the age of 67. However, the day before the death of the 10th Duke, it was announced that he had given his ancestral seat of Blair Castle and most of his estates to a charitable trust, thus effectively disinheriting his heir. He had been unimpressed when his heir had indicated that he had no desire to leave South Africa for Scotland. The new duke thus inherited little but the titles and the right to raise a private army.

Atholl continued to live in South Africa, while making annual visits to Scotland. He died on 15 May 2012 in a South African hospital at the age of 83. He was succeeded in his titles by his elder son, Bruce Murray, Marquess of Tullibardine.

As Duke of Atholl, he commanded the only legal private army in Europe, the Atholl Highlanders. The army is based at Blair Castle, the ancestral home of the dukes of Atholl. The Duke did not inherit Blair Castle, which passed to a charitable trust. However, every year the Duke visited from South Africa to stay at Blair for the traditional display put on by his army.

The Duke was also the hereditary Clan Chief of Clan Murray.

References

 "Burke's Peerage and Baronetage"
 http://www.van-gool.info/Leach.htm
 http://familytreemaker.genealogy.com/users/d/u/p/Amanda-M-Du-plessis/WEBSITE-0001/UHP-0011.html
 http://www.southafricansettlers.com/

External links

 

1929 births
111
People from Johannesburg
South African people of Scottish descent
2012 deaths
John
Dukes of Rannoch
20th-century Scottish businesspeople
Atholl